Renigunta Junction railway station (station code: RU) is a railway station located in Tirupati district in the Indian state of Andhra Pradesh. It serves Tirupati city and its suburban areas in Tirupati district. People alight here to go to Tirupati for pilgrimage and it also has bus connection to various Tirupati temples from this Railway station.

Classification
Renigunta Junction is classified as an A–category station in the Guntakal railway division.

References

Tirupati district
Transport in Tirupati
Railway stations in Tirupati district
Guntakal railway division
Railway junction stations in Andhra Pradesh